Tommy Faile (September 15, 1928 – August 2, 1998) was an American songwriter and singer best known for composing "Phantom 309" and singing "The Legend of the Brown Mountain Lights". He was known for his deep voice and comic on-stage banter.

Biography
Born in Lancaster, South Carolina, Faile got his start on local radio in 1946 with Snuffy Jenkins, Homer Sherrill and the Hired Hands on WIS in Columbia, South Carolina.  Faile also appeared on national radio in 1949 on "Philip Morris Night with Horace Heidt".  In 1951, he joined Arthur "Guitar Boogie" Smith's Crackerjacks as a bass player and singer. Faile also sang bass for Smith's gospel group, The Crossroads Quartet. Faile remained with Smith for eighteen years, and later had his own television show in the early 1970s, which aired on WBTV in Charlotte, North Carolina. In 1995, he joined Curly Howard's radio program on WKMT. He died of a heart attack in 1998.

References

External links 
 Discography

1928 births
1998 deaths
20th-century American musicians
Country musicians from South Carolina